Arthur Emil von Weissenberg (25 January 1863, Viipuri – 15 February 1945) was a Finnish jurist and politician. He was a Member of the Diet of Finland and a Member of the Parliament of Finland from 1913 to 1916.

References

1863 births
1945 deaths
Politicians from Vyborg
People from Viipuri Province (Grand Duchy of Finland)
Finnish Party politicians
Members of the Diet of Finland
Members of the Parliament of Finland (1913–16)
University of Helsinki alumni